R4D Nunatak is a nunatak lying 2 nautical miles (3.7 km) southeast of Burkett Nunatak, at the southeast end of Monument Nunataks. Named by the Northern Party of New Zealand Geological Survey Antarctic Expedition (NZGSAE), 1962–63, after the R4D "Dakota" aircraft used by the U.S. Navy to transport the Northern Party to this area, and to resupply and return the party to Scott Base.

Nunataks of Victoria Land
Pennell Coast